Denzlingen is a municipality in the district of Emmendingen, in Baden-Württemberg, Germany.

Geography 
Denzlingen is located in the Upper Rhine Valley (Oberrheinische Tiefebene) at the edge of the Black Forest (Schwarzwald) between the river Elz in the north and the Glotter which runs through the southern part of the town. The Glotter Valley (Glottertal) is to the east, and the Elz Valley (Elztal) to the northeast. The westernmost foothills of the Black Forest and the town of Freiamt lie to the north. From northwest to southwest the Upper Rhine Valley allows a clear view of the Kaiserstuhl hills and of the Vosges Mountains on the French side of the Rhine. The Mauracher Berg is a small mountain in the north of the township with some interesting geological features.

Neighboring municipalities 
Clockwise, starting in the north, Denzlingen is surrounded by Emmendingen, Sexau and Waldkirch in the district of Emmendingen, Glottertal, Heuweiler and Gundelfingen in the district Breisgau-Hochschwarzwald, and Vörstetten in the district of Emmendingen.

History 
Denzlingen was already settled during the time of the Roman Empire. It was named after the Alemannic tribal chief Denzilo who lived here in the 5th century. The first explicit mention of the town dates back to the year 984. Medieval Denzlingen consisted of two separate settlements, Niederdorf and Oberdorf (Lower Village and Upper Village), both on the Glotter and alongside an old road from Riegel to the Glottertal. The two settlements eventually grew together into one stretched-out town, which led to the sobriquet of Langendenzlingen, meaning "Long Denzlingen".

The town was destroyed during the Thirty Years' War. The Thirty Years' War veteran Hans Jakob Christoffel von Grimmelshausen described the battle between Imperial and Swedish troops at Denzlingen in the novel Simplicius Simplicissimus.

The town has grown rapidly since the 19th century, especially after being connected to the Baden railroad system in 1845.

Religion 
As a former part of the Margraviate Baden, Denzlingen was predominantly Protestant. Today, 34% of the residents are Protestant. As most of the people moving to Denzlingen were Roman Catholics, the balance shifted, and today 42% of the inhabitants are Catholic. The first Catholic church after the Reformation was consecrated in 1888. Today, the Catholic community meets in St. James Church, which was built in the years 1975 and 1976. Other religious denominations (mostly members of the New Apostolic Church and Baptists) account for about 1% of the population, while 23% remain nondenominational.

Population 

As of 31 December of each year; source: Gemeinde Denzlingen, Zahlenspiegel

Political situation

Civil parish 
The last elections (25 May 2014) led to the following allocation of seats: 

FWG now contains Bürgeraktion Pro Storch which held 2 seats and had 9.8% of the votes in 2009; the calculations in the table are based only on the FWG result from 2009.

Mayor 
After the death of mayor Lothar Fischer in April 2009, Markus Hollemann (ÖDP) was elected as his successor on 19 June 2009.

Coat of arms 
The coat of arms of Denzlingen is Or a bend gules (the coat of arms of Baden) impaling Azure a plowshare argent.  The town's seal shows the same, and dates to 1458.

Twin cities 
Denzlingen is twinned with four European cities:

 In 1974 with the French town Saint-Cyr-sur-Mer which is on the Côte d'Azur in Provence
 In 1988 with the English town of North Hykeham in Lincolnshire
 In 1993 with the Italian town of Città della Pieve in Umbria
 In 2011 with the Polish town of Konstancin-Jeziorna in Masovian Voivodeship

Personalities
Maximilian Heidenreich (born 1967), former footballer, lives in Denzlingen.
Mike Kluge (born 1962), cyclist and cyclocross world champion 1992, lives in Denzlingen.
Hanka Kupfernagel (born 1974), German champion, European champion and world champion in cycling, lived in Denzlingen.

References

External links

 https://web.archive.org/web/20071130182439/http://www.denzlingen.de/ Town website

Emmendingen (district)